Toksvig is a Danish language surname. Notable people with the name include:

 Claus Toksvig (1929–1988), Danish broadcaster and member of the European Parliament for Denmark
 Sandi Toksvig (born 1958), Danish-British writer, performer, and presenter
 Signe Toksvig (1891–1983), Danish author of fiction and non-fiction, including a definitive text on Hans Christian Andersen

Danish-language surnames